W11 Opera is an independent opera company in London which produces operas performed by young people aged 9 to 18. Founded in 1971, it takes its name from its location in W11, a postal district in West London consisting largely of Notting Hill and parts of Holland Park.

Almost all of the productions are new works created by composers such as George Fenton, John Gardner, Richard Harvey, Colin Towns and Timothy Kraemer. Some of these works go on to be revived by schools and other opera companies.

Notable alumni of the company include Eve Best, Jonathan Antoine and Sophie Ellis-Bextor.

Works commissioned and premiered
W11 Opera has commissioned and produced almost 40 new operas, more than any other UK company, providing a repertoire of music theatre for its cast of 9- to 18-year-olds. Each has a running time of just over one hour. Most of the group's commissions are available for performance by schools and music theatre groups. 

1971	Noye's Fludde* 	Benjamin Britten, (Chester Mystery play)
1972	The Pied Piper Christopher Bowers-Broadbent, Jeremy Hornsby
1973 	Bel and the Dragon, John Gardner, Timothy Kraemer
1974	The Winter Star*, Malcolm Williamson
1975	Joseph and the Amazing Technicolor Dreamcoat *, Andrew Lloyd Webber, Tim Rice
1976	Like This, Like That, Timothy Kraemer, Peter Dickinson
1977 	The Adventures of Jonah, Timothy Kraemer, Timothy Kraemer and Peter Dickinson 
1978	The Girl and the Unicorn, Stephen Oliver, Stephen Oliver
1979	Dreamtime, Daryl Runswick, Daryl Runswick	
1980	Mak the Sheep Stealer*, Herbert Chappell, Don Taylor
1981	Wenceslas, Timothy Kraemer, Timothy Kraemer
1982 	Birthday (revived 1998), George Fenton, Timothy Kraemer 
1983	Rainbow Planet, Christopher Gunning, Timothy Rose Price
1984 	The Adventures of Jonah, + 	Timothy Kraemer, Timothy Kraemer & Peter Dickinson 
1985	Bel and the Dragon, + John Gardner, Timothy Kraemer
1986	The Tin Knight, Francis Shaw, Michael Finch
1987 	Ulysses and the Wooden Horse, Timothy Kraemer, Timothy Kraemer
1988	The Return of Odysseus, David Bedford, David Bedford
1989	Koppelberg,	Steve Gray, Norman Brooke
1990	Double Trouble, Louisa Lasdun, Adam Thorpe
1991	A Time of Miracles, Richard Harvey, John Kane
1992	Listen to the Earth, Steve Gray, Sarah Shuckburgh
1993	Traveller’s Tale, Michael Kamen, Michael Kamen
1994	Antiphony, (revived 2005), John Kane 
1995	The Dancing Princesses, Bill Connor, Nick Renton
1996	Ulysses and the Wooden Horse, + Timothy Kraemer, Timothy Kraemer
1997	Eloise, Karl Jenkins, Carol Barratt 
1999	Rip, Colin Towns, Martin Newell
2000	Deep Waters, Cecilia McDowall, Christie Dickason
2001	Flying High, Graham Preskett, John Kane
2002	Stormlight, David Knotts, Katharine Craik
2003	Game Over, Guy Dagul, Jane Aspeling
2004	All in the Mind, Edward Lambert, Edward Lambert
2005	ANTiphony, + Graham Preskett, John Kane
2006	Chincha-Chancha Cooroo, Bernard Hughes, William Radice 
2007	Shadowtracks, Julian Grant, Tina Jones
2008	The Song of Rhiannon, Mark Bowden, Helen Cooper
2009	The Whale Savers, Martin Ward, Phil Porter
2010	Rain Dance, Stuart Hancock, Donald Sturrock
2011	Original Features, Julian Grant, Christina Jones
2012	Good Intentions, Julian Philips, Simon Christmas
2013	The Fizz, Martin Ward, Phil Porter
2014	Deep Waters, + Cecilia McDowall, Christie Dickason
2015	Eliza and the Swans, John Barber, Hazel Gould
2016	The Price, Russell Hepplewhite, Helen Eastman
2017	The Cutlass Crew, Stuart Hancock, Donald Sturrock
2018	Shadow Tracks, + Julian Grant, Christina Jones 

Note: * not a W11 Opera commission; + denotes commission revivals

British opera companies
Opera in London
Musical groups established in 1971